Australian Jazz Bell Awards, also known as the Bell Awards or The Bells, are annual music awards for the jazz music genre in Australia. They were named in honour of Australian jazz pianist, composer and band leader, Graeme Bell (1914–2012), at their inception in 2003 at the Melbourne International Jazz Festival.

The awards were announced by Bell and Victoria's Minister for the Arts, Mary Delahunty, on 5 June 2003 to recognise the talent and achievements of Australian jazz artists locally and internationally. They were the inspiration of festival chairman, Albert Dadon, and its artistic director, Adrian Jackson. The latter explained, "The Bells will put the spotlight on the Australian jazz industry that it has never enjoyed before. These new industry gongs will recognise the achievement of excellence by many artists, record companies and venues, and will encourage others to match those achievements." The awards were not presented in 2005.

In 2008, the Australian Jazz Awards Limited, a not-for-profit organisation with its own independent board, was established to present the awards, which became separate from the Melbourne Jazz Festival committee. The number and title of categories have varied with nine to six artists being honoured.

Awards

2003 Bell Awards

The inaugural Australian Jazz Awards, or Bell Awards, were presented at Melbourne's Grand Hyatt Hotel on 28 August 2003, honouring artists in nine categories.

|-
|rowspan="9"| 2003 || Sandy Evans || Australian Jazz Artist of the Year || 
|-
| | Australian Art Orchestra || Australian Jazz Ensemble of the Year || 
|-
| | Bennetts Lane Big Band || Australian Jazz Venue of the Year || 
|-
| | Collected Works – Allan Browne || Best Australian Classic Jazz Album || 
|-
| | Mikrokosmos – Andrea Keller || Best Australian Contemporary Jazz Album || 
|-
| | Making Wings – Judy Jacques || Best Australian Jazz Vocal Album || 
|-
| | The Soul of Things – Tomasz Stanko || International Jazz Album of the Year || 
|-
| | Aron Ottignon || Young Australian Jazz Artist of the Year || 
|-
| | Ade Monsbourgh || Graeme Bell Hall of Fame ||

2004 Bell Awards

On 10 August 2004 a new artistic director of the Melbourne International Jazz festival, Carlo Pagnotta, formerly director of Italy's famed Umbria Jazz Festival, announced the 27 nominees of the Bell Awards, honouring artists in nine categories. The winners were awarded in nine categories on 25 August in Melbourne.

|-
|rowspan="27"| 2004 || style="background:#98ff98;"| Phil Slater || rowspan="3"| Australian Jazz Artist of the Year || 
|-
| | Paul Grabowsky || 
|-
| | Jamie Oehlers || 
|-
| style="background:#98ff98;"| The Necks || rowspan="3"| Australian Jazz Ensemble of the Year || 
|-
| | Alister Spence Trio || 
|-
| | Julien Wilson Trio || 
|-
| style="background:#98ff98;"| Bennetts Lane Big Band || rowspan="3"| Australian Jazz Venue of the Year || 
|-
| | Side-On Cafe || 
|-
| | Hyde Park Hotel || 
|-
| style="background:#98ff98;"| Bob Barnard's Jazz Party – Bob Barnard || rowspan="3"| Best Australian Classic Jazz Album || 
|-
| | Catfish Row – Moovin' & Groovin' Orchestra || 
|-
| | Now You Are Talking My Language – Society Syncopators || 
|-
| style="background:#98ff98;"| Big Small Band Live – Mike Nock || rowspan="3"| Best Australian Contemporary Jazz Album || 
|-
| | Tales of Time and Space – Paul Grabowsky || 
|-
| | Strobe Coma Virgo – Phil Slater || 
|-
| style="background:#98ff98;"| The Secret – Alison Wedding || rowspan="3"| Best Australian Jazz Vocal Album || 
|-
| | Gold – Vince Jones || 
|-
| | The Crying Game – Michelle Nicolle || 
|-
| style="background:#98ff98;"| Suspended Night – Tomasz Stanko Quartet || rowspan="3"| International Jazz Album of the Year || 
|-
| | Up for It – Keith Jarrett || 
|-
| | I'm All For You – Joe Lovano || 
|-
| style="background:#98ff98;"| Felix Bloxsom || rowspan="3"| Young Australian Jazz Artist of the Year || 
|-
| | Aaron Choulai || 
|-
| | Mat Jodrell || 
|-
| style="background:#98ff98;"| Allan Browne || rowspan="3"| Graeme Bell Hall of Fame || 
|-
| | Don Burrows || 
|-
| | John Pochée ||

2006 Bell Awards

In 2006 Albert Dadon took over the role of artistic director of the Melbourne International Jazz festival, following differences with Pagnotta over the festival's direction. Dadon is chairman of the Australian Jazz Bell Awards, honouring artists in nine categories.

|-
|rowspan="9"| 2006 || Paul Grabowsky || Australian Jazz Artist of the Year || 
|-
| | The Necks || Australian Jazz Ensemble of the Year || 
|-
| | Bennetts Lane Big Band || Australian Jazz Venue of the Year || 
|-
| | Live at Umbria Jazz '05 – Joe Chindamo || Best Australian Classic Jazz Album || 
|-
| | The Assemblers – Jamie Oehlers || Best Australian Contemporary Jazz Album || 
|-
| | Moon of Manakoora – Janet Seidel || Best Australian Jazz Vocal Album || 
|-
| | The Ground – Tord Gustavsen Trio || International Jazz Album of the Year || 
|-
| | Aaron Choulai || Young Australian Jazz Artist of the Year || 
|-
| | John Pochée || Graeme Bell Hall of Fame ||

2007 Bell Awards

In 2007 Albert Dadon continued as artistic director of the Melbourne International Jazz festival and as chairman of the Australian Jazz Bell Awards, honouring artists in seven categories.

|-
|rowspan="7"| 2007 || Jamie Oehlers || Australian Jazz Artist of the Year || 
|-
| | "Five Bells" – Paul Grabowsky || Australian Jazz Composition of the Year || 
|-
| | Five Bells and Other Inspirations – Allan Browne's Australian Jazz Band || Best Australian Classic Jazz Album || 
|-
| | You R Here - Session 2 – Jamie Oehlers Double Drummer Group || Best Australian Contemporary Jazz Album || 
|-
| | Grace – Lisa Young || Best Australian Jazz Vocal Album || 
|-
| | Shannon Barnett || Young Australian Jazz Artist of the Year || 
|-
| | Don Burrows || Graeme Bell Hall of Fame ||

2008 Bell Awards

On 29 April 2008 the Australian Jazz Awards Limited presented the Australian Jazz Bell Awards, with Deputy Prime Minister of Australia, Julia Gillard attending. The awards were separated from the Melbourne Jazz Festival in 2008 and a new company was formed, The Australian Jazz Awards Limited, a not-for-profit organisation with its own independent board, to run the ceremony. They honoured artists in eight categories.

|-
|rowspan="18"| 2008 || Julien Wilson || Australian Jazz Artist of the Year || 
|-
| | The Fool Poets Portion – Eugene Ball || rowspan="3"| Australian Jazz Composition of the Year || 
|-
| | 14 Little Creatures – Stephen Magnusson || 
|-
| | The Thousands – Phil Slater || 
|-
| | Cuttin' Capers – Sweet Lowdowns || rowspan="3"| Best Australian Classic Jazz Album || 
|-
| | The Misty Downs Session – Howler's Cotton Club || 
|-
| | In-Sync – The Syncopators || 
|-
| | Little Claps – Andrea Keller Quartet || rowspan="3"| Best Australian Contemporary Jazz Album || 
|-
| | The Drunken Boat – Allan Browne Quintet || 
|-
| | The Thousands – Phil Slater || 
|-
| | Phil Slater Quartet || rowspan="3"| Best Australian Jazz Ensemble || 
|-
| | Allan Browne Quintet || 
|-
| | Julien Wilson Trio || 
|-
| | Nightlight – Megan Washington || rowspan="3"| Best Australian Jazz Vocal Album || 
|-
| | Elana Stone – Elana Stone || 
|-
| | Cuttin' Capers – Sweet Lowdowns || 
|-
| | Sam Anning || Young Australian Jazz Artist of the Year || 
|-
| | Bernie McGann || Graeme Bell Hall of Fame ||

2009 Bell Awards

On 23 April 2009 the Australian Jazz Awards Limited presented the Australian Jazz Bell Awards, with Deputy Prime Minister of Australia, Julia Gillard attending. They honoured artists in seven categories.

|-
|rowspan="7"| 2009 || Live at the Famous Spiegeltent – The Syncopators || Best Australian Classic Jazz Album || 
|-
| | Lost and Found – Oehlers, Grabowsky, Beck || Best Australian Contemporary Jazz Album || 
|-
| | Old Grooves for New Streets – Way Out West || Best Australian Jazz Ensemble || 
|-
| | "Till Death Does Me Part" – Johannes Luebbers || Best Australian Jazz Song || 
|-
| | Work Songs – Tina Harrod || Best Australian Jazz Vocal Album || 
|-
| | Jeremy Rose || Young Australian Jazz Artist of the Year || 
|-
| | Mike Nock || Graeme Bell Hall of Fame ||

2010 Bell Awards

On 15 April 2010 the 7th Australian Jazz Bell Awards were presented. They honoured artists in seven categories.

|-
|rowspan="7"| 2010 || The Gathering – Stu Hunter || Best Australian Contemporary Jazz Album || 
|-
| | Homage – Sam Anning, Allan Browne, Marc Hannaford || Best Australian Classic Jazz Album || 
|-
| | Epic – Jonathan Zwartz || Best Australian Jazz Ensemble || 
|-
| | "The Sea" – Jonathan Zwartz || Best Australian Jazz Song || 
|-
| | If You Were There – Kristin Berardi || Best Australian Jazz Vocal Album || 
|-
| | Linda Oh || Young Australian Jazz Artist of the Year || 
|-
| | Bob Barnard || Graeme Bell Hall of Fame ||

2011 Bell Awards

On 5 May 2011 the 8th Australian Jazz Bell Awards were presented. They honoured artists in eight categories.

|-
|rowspan="8"| 2011 || The New Sheiks – Leigh Barker || Best Australian Traditional Jazz Album || 
|-
| | An Accumulation of Subtleties – Mike Nock Trio || Best Australian Contemporary Jazz Album || 
|-
| | The Subterraneans – The Subterraneans || Best Australian Jazz Blend Album || 
|-
| | Australian Art Orchestra/Young Wagilak Group || Best Australian Jazz Ensemble || 
|-
| | Song from the Highest Tower – Eugene Ball || Best Australian Jazz Song || 
|-
| | Elly Hoyt – Elly Hoyt || Best Australian Jazz Vocal Album || 
|-
| | Johannes Luebbers || Young Australian Jazz Artist of the Year || 
|-
| | Tony Gould || Graeme Bell Hall of Fame ||

2012 Bell Awards

On 3 May 2012 the 9th Australian Jazz Bell Awards were presented. They honoured artists in eight categories.

|-
|rowspan="8"| 2012 || Collected Works Volume II: Fifty Years of New Orleans Jazz – Alan Browne || Best Australian Traditional Jazz Album || 
|-
|   | 1234 – Nick Haywood Quartet || Best Australian Contemporary Jazz Album || 
|-
|   | Fish Boast of Fishing – Peter Knight || Most Original Australian Jazz Album || 
|-
|   | Andrea Keller Quartet || Best Australian Jazz Ensemble || 
|-
|   | "Spir" – Luke Howard & Janos Bruneel || Best Australian Jazz Song || 
|-
|   | Kristin Berardi Meets The Jazzgroove Mothership Orchestra – Kristin Berardi Meets Jazzgroove Mothership Orchestra || Best Australian Jazz Vocal Album || 
|-
|   | Alex Boneham || Young Australian Jazz Artist of the Year || 
|-
|   | Brian Brown || Graeme Bell Hall of Fame ||

2013 Bell Awards

On 2 May 2013 the 10th Australian Jazz Bell Awards were presented by Jazz Artist and Chairman Albert Dadon AM and with Tracey Curro as MC at Melbourne's Regent Theatre. They honoured artists in eight categories.

|-
|rowspan="8"| 2013 || A Great Day for the Race – Flap! || Best Australian Traditional Jazz Album || 
|-
| | Magnet – MAGNET || Best Australian Contemporary Jazz Album || 
|-
| | Sarcophile – Marc Hannaford || Most Original Australian Jazz Album || 
|-
| | David Ades & Friends || Best Australian Jazz Ensemble || 
|-
| | "Joe the Kid" – David Ades & Friends || Best Australian Jazz Song || 
|-
| | The Song That Sings You Here – Chris McNulty || Best Australian Jazz Vocal Album || 
|-
| | Steve Barry || Young Australian Jazz Artist of the Year || 
|-
| | James Morrison || Graeme Bell Hall of Fame ||

2014 Bell Awards

On 1 May 2014 the 11th Australian Jazz Bell Awards were presented by jazz artist and Australian Jazz Awards Limited chairman, Albert Dadon, with Tracey Curro as MC at Melbourne's Plaza Ballroom. They honoured artists in eight categories.

|-
|rowspan="8"| 2014 || This Is Always – Julien Wilson Quartet || Best Australian Traditional Jazz Album || 
|-
| | Monash Art Ensemble – Monash Art Ensemble || Best Australian Contemporary Avant-garde Jazz Album || 
|-
| | Wave Rider – Andrea Keller Quartet || Best Australian Modern Jazz Album || 
|-
| | This Is Always – Julien Wilson Quartet || Best Australian Jazz Ensemble || 
|-
| | "Trout River" – Julien Wilson || Best Australian Jazz Song || 
|-
| | Rise and Fall – Allira Wilson || Best Australian Jazz Vocal Album || 
|-
| | Monash Art Ensemble – Joseph O'Connor || Young Australian Jazz Artist of the Year || 
|-
| | Judy Bailey || Graeme Bell Hall of Fame ||

2015 Bell Awards

On 30 April 2015 the 12th Australian Jazz Bell Awards were presented and hosted by Helen Kapalos at Melbourne's Regent Theatre. Nominees were announced on 20 April. The ceremony honoured artists in eight categories.

|-
|rowspan="22"| 2015 || A-Z of Jazz – James Morrison ||rowspan="3"| Best Australian Traditional Jazz Album || 
|-
| The Hunters & Pointers – The Hunters & Pointers || 
|-
| Clarence Williams Tribute – Geoff Bull || 
|-
| | Hexis – Monash Art Ensemble, George Lewis ||rowspan="3"| Best Australian Contemporary Avant-garde Jazz Album || 
|-
| Don't Feed – Trio Feral, Barney McAll || 
|-
| My Cuban Soul – Paul van Ross || 
|-
| | Su Su Nje – Daniel Susnjar ||rowspan="3"| Best Australian Modern Jazz Album || 
|-
| The Bitter Suite – Paul Grabowsky || 
|-
| The Last Sanctuary – James Mustafa Orchestra || 
|-
| | Suite Sima – Mike Nock Octet ||rowspan="3"| Best Australian Jazz Ensemble || 
|-
| Su Su Nje – Daniel Susnjar || 
|-
| Return Journey – Daryl McKenzie Orchestra || 
|-
| | "Forte Pulse Torte" – Daniel Susnjar ||rowspan="3"| Best Australian Jazz Song || 
|-
| "Black Saffron" – Paul Grabowsky || 
|-
| "Some Kind of Dream" – Penelope Sai || 
|-
| | We Could Be Lovers – Sarah McKenzie ||rowspan="3"| Best Australian Jazz Vocal Album || 
|-
| Songs of Friends – Josh Kyle & Sam Keevers || 
|-
| Aspirations – Tom Barton || 
|-
| |  The Last Sanctuary – James Mustafa Orchestra ||rowspan="3"| Young Australian Jazz Artist of the Year || 
|-
| Inverno – Nic Vardenga || 
|-
| Not Alone – Jessica Carlton || 
|-
| | Graeme Lyall || Graeme Bell Hall of Fame ||

2016 Bell Awards

On 20 June 2016 the 13th Australian Jazz Bell Awards were presented at Bird's Basement, Melbourne. Nominees were announced on 12 May. The ceremony honoured artists in eight categories.

|-
|rowspan="22"| 2016 || Mooroolbark – Barney McAll ||rowspan="3"| Best Australian Instrumental Jazz Album || 
|-
| Lady Luck – Angela Davis || 
|-
| This Narrow Isthmus – Julien Wilson Quartet || 
|-
| | Ithaca Bound – Allan Browne Quintet ||rowspan="3"| Best Australian Small Jazz Band || 
|-
| Mooroolbark – Barney McAll & Australian Symbiotic Improvisers Orbit || 
|-
| Alister Spence Trio: Live – Alister Spence Trio || 
|-
| | Beginning and End of Knowing – Mike Nock / Laurence Pike ||rowspan="3"| Best Produced Album || 
|-
| Mooroolbark – Barney McAll || 
|-
| Lady Luck – Angela Davis || 
|-
| | 2015 Live Performance Compilation – Jazzgroove Mothership Orchestra ||rowspan="3"| Best Australian Jazz Ensemble || 
|-
| The Daniel Susnjar Afro-Peruvian Jazz Group – Daniel Susnjar || 
|-
| Music for Average Photography – Mace Francis Orchestra || 
|-
| | "Nectar Spur" – Barney McAll ||rowspan="3"| Best Australian Jazz Song || 
|-
| "Weeping Willow" – Julien Wilson Quartet || 
|-
| "A Thousand Feet from Bergen Street" – Angela Davis || 
|-
| | Where or When – Kristin Berardi ||rowspan="3"| Best Australian Jazz Vocal Album || 
|-
| Provenance – Vince Jones & Paul Grabowsky || 
|-
| Keep an Eye on Spring – Olivia Chindamo || 
|-
| | Keep an Eye on Spring – Olivia Chindamo ||rowspan="3"| Young Australian Jazz Artist of the Year || 
|-
| Counter Clockwork – James McLean || 
|-
| Manticore – Niran Dasika || 
|-
| | Joe Chindamo || Graeme Bell Hall of Fame ||

2017 Bell Awards

On 15 May 2017 the 14th Australian Jazz Bell Awards were presented at Bird's Basement, Melbourne. Nominees were announced on 27 April. The ceremony honoured artists in seven categories.

|-
|rowspan="17"| 2017 || Consider This – Andrea Keller and Tim Wilson Duo ||rowspan="3"| Best Australian Instrumental Jazz Album || 
|-
| Iron in the Blood – Jeremy Rose and the Earshift Orchestra || 
|-
| Stu Hunter || 
|-
| | Iron in the Blood – Jeremy Rose and the Earshift Orchestra ||rowspan="3"| Best Produced Album || 
|-
| Consider This – Andrea Keller and Tim Wilson Duo || 
|-
| The Migration – Stu Hunter || 
|-
| | The Migration – Stu Hunter ||rowspan="3"| Best Australian Jazz Ensemble || 
|-
| A Flower is a Lovesome Thing – Michelle Nicolle Quartet || 
|-
| The Vampires || 
|-
| | "Eagle Fish" – Stu Hunter ||rowspan="3"| Best Australian Jazz Song || 
|-
| Andrea Keller and Tim Wilson Duo || 
|-
| Eugene Ball 4tet || 
|-
| | A Flower is a Lovesome Thing – Michelle Nicolle Quartet ||rowspan="3"| Best Australian Jazz Vocal Album || 
|-
| Kristin Bernardi || 
|-
| The Migration – Stu Hunter || 
|-
| | Harry Mitchell || Young Australian Jazz Artist of the Year || 
|-
| | Ted Vining || Graeme Bell Hall of Fame ||

2018 Bell Awards

Source: They honoured artists in seven categories.

|-
|rowspan="7"| 2018 || Still Night: Music in Poetry  – Andrea Keller  || Best Australian Jazz Vocal Album || 
|-
| rowspan="3"|  Hearing the Blood – Barney McAll || Best Australian Instrumental Jazz Album  || 
|-
|| Best Produced Album  || 
|-
|| Best Australian Jazz Ensemble of the Year || 
|-
||  "Judgement Day" – Speedball || Best Australian Jazz Song of the Year || 
|-
||  Skylines – Evan Harris || Young Australian Jazz Artist of the Year || 
|-
|| Bob Sedergreen || Graeme Bell Hall of Fame ||

2019 Bell Awards 
They honoured artists in seven categories.

|-
|rowspan="7"| 2019 || Trombone Song Cycle  – Josh Kyle  || Best Australian Jazz Vocal Album || 
|-
||  Across a Field as Vast as One – Sam Anning  || Best Australian Instrumental Jazz Album  || 
|-
|| Zephyrix - Barney McAll || Best Produced Album  || 
|-
|| Five Below Live - Andrea Keller|| Best Australian Jazz Ensemble of the Year || 
|-
|| Suzaku – Niran Dasika || Young Australian Jazz Artist of the Year || 
|-
|| "Animarum" (from Animarum) - Jonathan Zwartz || Best Jazz Work of the Year || 
|-
|| Sandy Evans || Graeme Bell Hall of Fame ||

See also
 Melbourne International Jazz Festival
 Australian jazz

References

External links
 

Australian jazz
Australian music awards
Jazz awards